Galina Konstantinovna Shubina (Russian: Галина Константиновна Шубина; 1902–1980), was a Soviet poster and graphics artist.

Biography 
Galina Shubina was born in Voronezh in 1902. From the age of 13 she studied in the watercolour class at the local art school. 
After graduating from the Academy Galina moved to Moscow in 1929. The same year she becomes a member of the Artists' Union. Galina's husband Soslanbek Tavasiev was a sculptor and her daughter Galina Dmitrieva is a Moscow graphic artist.

Works 
She was particularly attracted by the art of Bakst. During her summer holidays she could spend long hours in her private "studio" - the garret of a big barn – drawing and modeling figures in red clay. She moved to Leningrad to study sculpture, but after two years in the faculty of sculpture at the Leningrad Academy of Arts, she transferred to the Academy's graphics faculty. Here she studied under the prominent artists Dmitry Mitrokhin and Kruglikova specializing in posters. Other teachers were Konashevich, Radlov, Shillingovskii and Petrov-Vodkin.

Thematically, her drawings of the 1920s and early 1930s revolve around the theatre; the early works were inspired by Art Nouveau, and the later ones
by the Russian avant-garde. Her works are often characterised by a strong sense of melancholy, and a not very subtle eroticism.

After graduating from the Academy and moving to Moscow in the late 1920s, Galina began to work in the field of political posters and portraits. She drew inspiration in Deineka's works. Her posters of the early 1930s and the pre-war years are all bright and optimistic.

Footnotes

Further reading 
 In Moskaus Kunstlerkolonie, A-T-Z, Berlin, 37, 1932
 Soviet Woman in Art, catalogue from exhibition, Paris, 1948
 The Soviet Political Poster. Demosfenova, Nurok, Shantyko, 1962
 Catalogue from Joint Exhibition: Galina Shubina, Vasilii Elkin, Nikolai Yakovlev, Moscow, 1975
 Catalogue from personal exhibition, Moscow, 1990
 Postcards in Arts, M. Chapkina, 1993
 Catalogue from exhibition with daughter Galina Dmitrieva, Erfurt, Germany, 1995
 The Russian Poster. 20th Century Masterpieces, Kontakt-Kultura, Moscow, 2000
 Women in the Russian Poster, Kontakt-Kultura, 2001
 600 Posters, Kontakt-Kultura, 2004
 Reality of the Utopia, Klaus Bashik, Nina Baburina, 2005
 "Galina Shubina" — Masters of Soviet Art, volume 1 (In English and Russian). Gamborg Gallery, 2008

External links 
 Examples of Galina Shubina's Art

1902 births
1980 deaths
Soviet painters
Soviet illustrators
Art Nouveau illustrators
Soviet artists
People from Voronezh